Axel Thomas Ngando Elessa (born 13 July 1993) is a French professional footballer who plays as a midfielder for Ligue 2 club Grenoble. At international level, he has represented France at various youth levels.

Club career
Ngando started his career playing for the "B" team of Rennes, who played in the Championnat de France Amateur. He scored his first goal for the "B" team on 21 May 2011 against Poiré-sur-Vie, in which he scored in the 47th minute to help his team to a 3–2 victory. His second goal for Rennes's reserves came on 4 November 2012 against La Chapelle-des-Marais, in which he scored in the 82nd minute to provide his team a 2–0 victory.

After several impressive matches for the Rennes "B" team, Ngando made his debut for the first-team in a Ligue 1 game on 2 February 2013 against Lorient, in which he came on as a 90th-minute substitute for Romain Alessandrini and scored a goal, just one minute into his debut in the 91st minute to equalize for Rennes and finish the match at a score of 2–2.

On 31 August 2015, Ngando joined Bastia on a three-year deal.

In 2017, he joined Süper Lig side Göztepe S.K. On 30 December 2021, he signed for Ligue 2 side Grenoble.

International career
Ngando is a France youth international, having represented his country at under-18 through under-21 levels, including winning the 2013 FIFA U-20 World Cup, in which he scored in the penalty shoot-out in the final.

Personal life
He is the nephew of former Cameroon international Patrick Mboma, and is eligible to represent either Cameroon or France at senior level.

Honours
France U20
FIFA U-20 World Cup: 2013

References

External links
 
 
 

1993 births
Living people
People from Asnières-sur-Seine
French footballers
Association football midfielders
France youth international footballers
France under-21 international footballers
French sportspeople of Cameroonian descent
Ligue 1 players
Ligue 2 players
Championnat National 3 players
Championnat National 2 players
Stade Rennais F.C. players
AJ Auxerre players
Angers SCO players
SC Bastia players
Grenoble Foot 38 players
Göztepe S.K. footballers
Footballers from Hauts-de-Seine
French expatriate footballers
French expatriate sportspeople in Turkey
Expatriate footballers in Turkey